"Tied Up" is a song recorded by American rapper Casey Veggies. It was released on April 27, 2015, as the second single from his debut studio album, Live & Grow (2015). The song produced by Kane Beatz and Luca Polizzi, features guest vocals from American rapper and singer Dej Loaf.

Music video
The music video for "Tied Up", directed by Alex Nazari, premiered on June 9, 2015, via Veggies' Vevo channel.

Charts

Certifications

References

External links
 
 

2015 singles
2015 songs
Dej Loaf songs
Song recordings produced by Kane Beatz
Songs written by PJ (singer)
Songs written by Kane Beatz
Songs written by Vinay Vyas
Songs written by Dej Loaf